Maurizio Cenni (born 12 January 1955 in Siena) is an Italian politician.

Cenni started his political career as a municipal councillor in Siena in 1993. He was elected Mayor of Siena on 14 May 2001 and re-elected for a second term on 30 May 2006.

References

See also
2001 Italian local elections
2006 Italian local elections
List of mayors of Siena

1955 births
Living people
Mayors of Siena
Democratic Party (Italy) politicians
Democrats of the Left politicians
Italian Communist Party politicians
Democratic Party of the Left politicians